Augustus Frederick Glossop Harris (5 June 1825 – 19 April 1873) was a British actor and theatre manager.

Born in Naples, Italy, in 1825 he was the son of Joseph Glossop, first manager of the Royal Coburg Theatre (now known as the Victoria Theatre or the Old Vic), and opera singer Mme Féron (aka Fearon), a former prima donna assoluta at La Scala in Milan.

Career
His early career saw limited success as a comedian in London, and he was imprisoned for bankruptcy in June 1848. By 1851 he had adopted the surname Harris.

Harris became a leading manager of opera and ballet, notably at Covent Garden, London, but also in Paris, Berlin and St. Petersburg. He wrote the libretto, with Edmund Falconer, for the opera The Rose of Castille, with music by Michael William Balfe; it was produced in London in 1857 and on Broadway in 1867. In the last four years of his life, he put on Christmas spectacles at Covent Garden.

Personal life
He married Maria Ann Bone on 17 February 1846. They had five children: daughters Ellen (Nelly), Maria, and Patience, a costume designer, and sons Charles and Augustus, an actor and theatrical manager.

Death
He died in 1873 and is buried in Brompton Cemetery, London.

Works
Gossip (with Thomas J. Williams, 1859)
My son Diana (1857)
A very serious affair (1857)
Ruthven (1859)
The avalanche; or; The trials of the heart (1854)
Too much of a good thing (1855)
Tom Thrasher (1868)
Doing the hansom (1856)
The little treasure (1855)
The little treasure (1880)
Satanella, comic opera (1863)
Too much of a good thing! (1855)

See also

Dick Warner (1856–1914), impresario

References

 Oxford Dictionary of National Biography

External links

Portrait

1825 births
1873 deaths
British male stage actors
British dramatists and playwrights
Burials at Brompton Cemetery
British theatre managers and producers
19th-century British male actors
British male dramatists and playwrights
19th-century British dramatists and playwrights
19th-century British male writers
19th-century British writers
19th-century British businesspeople